Skinburness is a village in the Allerdale district of Cumbria (historically Cumberland), England. It forms a residential area for the town of Silloth,  and is about 10 miles west of Wigton.

The Skinburness Hotel was the most prominent building in the village, but was demolished in 2017.

See also

Listed buildings in Silloth-on-Solway

References

External links

Solway Plain past and present - Skinburness history
Visit Cumbria - Skinburness

Villages in Cumbria
Populated coastal places in Cumbria
Silloth